Baldy Cinco, elevation , is a mountain in Hinsdale and Mineral counties in southern Colorado. The mountain, a thirteener, is located on the Continental Divide in the San Juan Mountains. Different areas of the slopes of Baldy Cinco lie in the Rio Grande National Forest, the La Garita Wilderness, and the Gunnison National Forest. The mountain is located just north of Snow Mesa and east northeast of Spring Creek Pass.

Name
The peak is one of a group of five summits in the east-central San Juan Mountains. Originally, the term "baldy cinco" was meant to refer to the five peaks collectively. Over time, however, the name became attached to this one peak.

Several sources refer to one of the other peaks as "Baldy No Es Cinco," indicating that mountain climbers have confused it for the actual Baldy Cinco.

Baldy Cinco is easily seen from Colorado State Highway 149 on the south ascent to Slumgullion Summit, where it appears in profile from across a broad mountain valley. A road sign on the highway there points to the mountain.

References

Mountains of Hinsdale County, Colorado
Mountains of Mineral County, Colorado
North American 4000 m summits
San Juan Mountains (Colorado)
Mountains of Colorado